Waimea refers to multiple places in Hawai‘i:

Waimea, Hawaii County, Hawaii
Waimea, Kauai County, Hawaii
Waimea Bay on O‘ahu
Waimea Canyon State Park on Kaua‘i